Adur Narseh was the ninth Sasanian King of Kings of Iran briefly in 309. Following his father's death, the nobles and Zoroastrian clergy saw an opportunity to gain influence within the Empire. Thus, they murdered Adur Narseh, blinded one of his brothers and forced another brother (Hormizd) to flee. He was succeeded by his infant brother Shapur II. 

Adur Narseh is only mentioned in some Greek sources, while oriental sources make no mention of him, and none of his coins have yet been found. The credibility of these Greek sources regarding Adur Narseh is questioned by Nikolaus Schindel, who believes that Adur Narseh probably never ruled.

Notes

References

Sources

 

 

3rd-century births
309 deaths
Year of birth unknown
4th-century Sasanian monarchs
Murdered Persian monarchs
4th-century murdered monarchs